Helen Aberson-Mayer (June 16, 1907 – April 3, 1999) was an American children's book author.

Aberson-Mayer was best known for co-authoring the story that inspired Walt Disney's 1941 film Dumbo. In collaboration with her then husband, Harold Pearl, Aberson-Mayer wrote Dumbo the Flying Elephant and sold it to Roll-A-Book, the publisher of a kind of novelty toy, although no copies of this original version have been found. The story was later published as a children's book.

Aberson-Mayer may have also authored several other children stories, but they were never published.

Early life and education 
Aberson-Mayer was born on June 16, 1907, in Syracuse, New York. Her parents were Anna and Morris Aberson. Her father is listed in city directories as a cigar maker in 1914 and as a grocer in 1930. Her parents were Russian-Jewish immigrants.

Aberson-Mayer graduated from Syracuse University in 1929. After graduation she worked in New York City doing social work. She returned to Syracuse in 1933 to direct dramatic actives at a children's camp and took a position as director of dramatical activities at a municipal recreational department. In August 1937, Aberson-Mayer started work as a radio commentator.

According to her family, Aberson-Mayer may have written more children's books into the 1960s, but none of them were published. Her niece recalled two of their titles: Sim, the Seal, and Otto, The Otter.

Aberson-Mayer died on April 3, 1999.

Dumbo the Flying Elephant 
Aberson-Mayor met Harold Pearl in October 1937, and they married on February 14, 1938. They co-wrote the Dumbo story and sold it to Roll-a-Book in 1939. No copies of the roll-a-book version have been found, though proofs of the story and examples of earlier versions of the medium indicate it may have existed.

Everett Whitmyre, the Syracuse advertising agent behind Roll-a-Book, sold the story to Walt Disney Productions in 1939. The story was supplemented with illustrations by Helen Durney. Aberson-Mayor may have earned about $1,000, some royalties, and credit rights for the sale. A series of Disney Golden Book versions of the story began publication in 1940.

References

1907 births
1999 deaths
Dumbo
People from Syracuse, New York
Syracuse University alumni
American writers